Magnolia gilbertoi is a species of flowering plant in the family Magnoliaceae. It is endemic to Colombia. It is known commonly as cana bravo and hojarasco de Gilberto.

This tree is part of the canopy in sub-Andean and Andean forests. It is cut for its wood and its habitat is being cleared for agriculture, making it an endangered species.

References

gilbertoi
Endemic flora of Colombia
Endangered plants
Taxonomy articles created by Polbot